Menno Bergsen (born 26 August 1999) is a Dutch professional footballer who plays as a goalkeeper for Slovenian PrvaLiga side NK Maribor. Besides the Netherlands, he has played in Slovakia and Slovenia.

Career
Bergsen made his senior debut in 2017 for FC Dordrecht. He played only two games for Dordrecht before switching to FC Eindhoven in 2018.

In June 2021, Bergsen joined Slovenian top flight side NK Maribor on a two-year contract. He made his league debut for Maribor on 23 April 2022, when he replaced the injured Ažbe Jug after fifteen minutes.

References

1999 births
Living people
People from Oud-Beijerland
Footballers from South Holland
Association football goalkeepers
Dutch footballers
Dutch expatriate footballers
FC Dordrecht players
FC Eindhoven players
AS Trenčín players
NK Maribor players
Eerste Divisie players
Slovak Super Liga players
Slovenian PrvaLiga players
Expatriate footballers in Slovakia
Dutch expatriate sportspeople in Slovakia
Expatriate footballers in Slovenia
Dutch expatriate sportspeople in Slovenia